Johann Georg Hamann (27 August 1730 – 21 June 1788) was a German Lutheran philosopher from Königsberg known as "the Wizard of the North" who was one of the leader figures of post-Kantian philosophy. His work was used by his student J. G. Herder as the main support of the Sturm und Drang movement, and is associated with the Counter-Enlightenment and Romanticism.  

He introduced Kant, also from Königsberg, to the works of both Hume – waking him from his "dogmatic slumber" – and Rousseau. Hamann was influenced by Hume, but he used his views to argue for rather than against Christianity.

Goethe and Kierkegaard were among those who considered him to be the finest mind of his time. He was also a key influence on Hegel and Jacobi. Long before the linguistic turn, Hamann believed epistemology should be replaced by the philosophy of language.

Early life

Hamann was born on 27 August 1730 in Königsberg (now Kaliningrad, Russia). Initially he studied theology at the University of Königsberg, but became a clerk in a mercantile house and afterward held many small public offices, devoting his leisure to reading philosophy. His first publication was a study in political economy about a dispute on nobility and trade.  He wrote under the pen name of "the Magus of the North". Hamann was a believer in the Enlightenment until a mystical experience in London in 1758.

His translation of David Hume into German is considered by most scholars to be the one that Hamann's friend Immanuel Kant, also from Königsberg, credited with awakening him from his "dogmatic slumber". Hamann and Kant held each other in mutual respect, although Hamann once declined an invitation by Kant to co-write a physics textbook for children. Hamann also introduced Kant to the work of Rousseau.

Music 
Hamann was a lutenist, having studied this instrument with Timofey Belogradsky (a student of Sylvius Leopold Weiss), a Ukrainian virtuoso then living in Königsberg.

Philosophical views
His distrust of autonomous, disembodied reason and the Enlightenment ("I look upon logical proofs the way a well-bred girl looks upon a love letter" was one of his many witticisms) led him to conclude that faith in God was the only solution to the vexing problems of philosophy.   

One of Kant's biographers compared him with Hamann: 

In Hamann's own terms Kant was a "Platonist" about reason, believing it disembodied, and Hamann an "Aristotelian" who believed it was embodied. Hamann was greatly influenced by Hume. This is most evident in Hamann's conviction that faith and belief, rather than knowledge, determine human actions. Also, Hamann asserted that the efficacy of a concept arises from the habits it reflects rather than any inherent quality it possesses.

Works 
Hamann's writings consist of small essays. They display two striking tendencies. The first is their brevity, in comparison with works by his contemporaries. The second is their breadth of allusion and delight in extended analogies. His work was also significantly reactive; rather than advance a "position" of his own, his principal mode of thinking was to respond to others' work. For example, his work Golgotha and Scheblimini! By a Preacher in the Wilderness (1784) was directed against Moses Mendelssohn's Jerusalem, or on Religious Might and Judaism (1782).

Hamann famously used the image of Socrates, who often proclaimed to know nothing, in his Socratic Memorabilia, an essay in which Hamann critiques the Enlightenment's dependence on reason. In Aesthetica in nuce, Hamann counters the Enlightenment by emphasizing the importance of aesthetic experience and the role of genius in intuiting nature.

Editions
Fragments of his writings were published by Cramer, under the title of Sibyllinische Blätter des Magus aus Norden (1819), and a complete edition by Roth (7 vols., 1821–25, with a volume of additions and explanations by Wiener, 1843). Hamann's des Magus in Norden Leben und Schriften, edited by Gildemeister, was published in 5 vols., 1857–68, and a new edition of his Schriften und Briefen, edited by Petri, in 4 vols., 1872-74.

God
Hamann argued that the communicatio idiomatum, namely, the communication of divine messages through material embodiments, applies not just to Christ, but should be generalised to cover all human action: "This communicatio of divine and human idiomatum is a fundamental law and the master-key of all our knowledge and of the whole visible economy."
Hamann believed all of creation were signs from God for us to interpret.

Reason is language
His most notable contributions to philosophy were his thoughts on language, which have often been considered as a forerunner to the linguistic turn in analytic philosophy such as Wittgenstein's. He famously said that "Reason is language" ("Vernunft ist Sprache"). Hamann thought the bridge between Kant's noumenal and phenomenal realms was language, with its noumenal meaning and phenomenal letters.

Legacy
Hamann was one of the precipitating forces for the Counter-Enlightenment. He was, moreover, a mentor to Herder and an admired influence on Goethe, Jacobi, Hegel, Kierkegaard, Lessing, and Mendelssohn. Roman Catholic theologian Hans Urs von Balthasar devoted a chapter to Hamann in his volume, Studies in Theological Styles: Lay Styles (Volume III in the English language translation of The Glory of the Lord series). Most recently, Hamann's influence can be found in the work of the theologians Oswald Bayer (Lutheran), John Milbank (Anglican), and David Bentley Hart (Eastern Orthodox). Finally, in Charles Taylor's important summative work, The Language Animal: The Full Shape of the Human Linguistic Capacity (Taylor, 2016),  Hamann is given credit, along with Wilhelm von Humboldt and Herder, for inspiring Taylor's "HHH" approach to the philosophy of language, emphasizing the creative power and cultural specificity of language.

However, recent scholarship, such as that by Bayer, contradicts the usual interpretation by people such as historian of ideas Isaiah Berlin, and describes Hamann as a "radical Enlightener" who vigorously opposed dogmatic rationalism in matters of philosophy and faith. Bayer views him as less the proto-Romantic that Herder presented, and more a premodern-postmodern thinker who brought the consequences of Lutheran theology to bear upon the burgeoning Enlightenment and especially in reaction to Kant.

References

Sources

 Isaiah Berlin, Three Critics of the Enlightenment: Vico, Hamann, Herder, London and Princeton, 2000, 
 Dickson, Gwen Griffith, Johann Georg Hamann's Relational Metacriticism (contains English translations of Socratic Memorabilia, Aesthetica in Nuce, a selection of essays on language, Essay of a Sibyl on Marriage and Metacritique of the Purism of Reason), Walter de Gruyter, 1995. 
 Forster, Michael N., After Herder: Philosophy of Language in the German Tradition, Oxford University Press, 2010, ch. 8–9.
 David Bentley Hart, "The Laughter of the Philosophers", First Things. January 2005.
 Kenneth Haynes (ed.), Hamann: Writings on Philosophy and Language (Cambridge Texts in the History of Philosophy), Cambridge University Press, 2007, 
 James C. O'Flaherty, Unity and Language: A Study in the Philosophy of Hamann, University of North Carolina, 1952;
 James C. O'Flaherty, Hamann's Socratic Memorabilia: A Translation and Commentary, Johns Hopkins Press, 1967; Library of Congress Catalog Card No. 67-12424;
 James C. O'Flaherty, Johann Georg Hamann, Twayne Publishers, 1979, ;
 James C. O'Flaherty, The Quarrel of Reason with Itself: Essays on Hamann, Michaelis, Lessing, Nietzsche, Camden House, 1988,

Further reading
 Alkire, Brian (2021). The Last Mask: Hamann's Theater of the Grotesque. Zürich: diaphanes, 2021 
 Anderson, Lisa Marie (ed.). Hamann and the Tradition. Illinois: Northwestern University Press, 2012 
 Alexander, W. M. (1966). Johann Georg Hamann: Philosophy and Faith. The Hague: Martinus Nijhoff.
 Beiser, Frederick (1987). The Fate of  Reason: German Philosophy from Kant to Fichte. Cambridge Mass.: Harvard University Press 
 Betz, John (2009). After Enlightenment: The Post-Secular Vision of J.G. Hamann. Oxford: Wiley Blackwell 
 Cattarini, L.S. (2018) Beyond Sartre and Sterility, contains introductory article on Hamann (Magus of the North)  
 Smith, Ronald Gregor (1960). J.G. Hamann 1730–1788: A Study in Christian Existence. New York: Harper & Brothers.
 Sparling, Robert Alan (2011). Johann Georg Hamann and the Enlightenment Project. Toronto: University of Toronto Press

External links
 
 
 
 
 Memoirs of Eminent Teachers and Educators: With Contributions to the History of Education in Germany (1878) Brown & Goss p. 533ff Retrieved May 23, 2012
 Notes on international conference on Hamann in March 2009 Retrieved May 18, 2012
 Hamann Briefe Letters
 Hamann, Nietzsche, and Wittgenstein on the Language of Philosophers - open access post-print version of chapter from Hamann and the Tradition (Illinois: Northwestern University Press, 2012), p. 104-121.
 Read online, french transaltion by Henry Corbin (1939) of Aesthetica In Nuce
 International Bibliography of works by and on Hamann, on Éditions Ionas website.
 

1730 births
1788 deaths
18th-century German Protestant theologians
German male non-fiction writers
Continental philosophers
Counter-Enlightenment
German lutenists
German Lutheran theologians
18th-century German philosophers
Hermeneutists
Writers from Königsberg
Philosophers of language
Sturm und Drang